Ibrahim Sissoko may refer to:

 Ibrahim Sissoko (footballer, born 1991), Ivorian football winger for Akhisarspor
 Ibrahim Sissoko (footballer, born 1995), French football forward for Fc Sochaux-Montbéliard

See also
 Ibrahima Sissoko (born 1997), French football midfielder